Bumi may refer to:

 Bumi River of Papua New Guinea
 Bumi Hills, a group of hills and a resort in Zimbabwe
 Bumi Thomas, a British-Nigerian musician
 Bumi Resources, a mining company of Indonesia
 Asia Resource Minerals, formerly known as Bumi plc, an international mining group
 The name of two characters in Avatar: The Last Airbender and The Legend of Korra

See also 
 Bhumi (disambiguation)
 Buumi, a royal title in several pre-colonial kingdoms of Senegal
 Boomi, New South Wales, a town in Australia
 Boomi River